Tinkhamia is a genus of longhorn beetles of the subfamily Lamiinae, containing the following species:

 Tinkhamia hamulata Gressitt, 1937
 Tinkhamia validicornis Gressitt, 1951

References

Gyaritini